Saint Barbara is an oil on panel painting by Parmigianino, created c. 1523, now in the Prado Museum in Madrid. Copies of it are in the Mauritshuis (inv. 354), Pomona College and Chatsworth House (inv. 508).

The painting arrived in Spain in 1686, when it was recorded in the real Alcázar di Madrid, and from 1746 in the Royal Palace of La Granja de San Ildefonso. It is universally attributed to Parmigianino and specifically his youth by comparison with the Virgin Mary in his Bardi Altarpiece and with his Saint Apollonia and Saint Lucy. Popham identifies a drawing at the Bonnat Museum in Bayonne as a possible preparatory study for the work.

History
It is probably the Saint Barbara acquired in 1624 with other works by princess Giulia d'Este for cardinal Alessandro d'Este and recorded in 1662 in the Muselli collection in Verona, the latter work being reported as "to my taste [one] of the most beautiful paintings by Parmigianino [...] by an arm's length".

References

Paintings by Parmigianino
Parmigiano
Paintings of the Museo del Prado by Italian artists
1523 paintings
Este collection